Kevin O'Brien is a Welsh rugby union coach. He coached the United States women's national rugby union team at the inaugural 1991 Women's Rugby World Cup. He is the only coach to have won a Rugby World Cup for the United States so far.

O'Brien attended Saint Mary's College in London, England from 1966 to 1970. He was initially contacted by Beantown Women's Rugby in Boston to be their Head Coach. He has coached for over 45 years and at all levels of rugby.

In 2021 O'Brien was inducted into the US Rugby Hall of Fame.

References 

Welsh rugby union coaches
United States national rugby union team coaches
Year of birth missing (living people)
Living people